The House of Commons Standing Committee on the Status of Women (FEWO) is a standing committee of the House of Commons of Canada. It was established in the 38th Canadian Parliament.

Mandate
The mandate and management of Status of Women Canada and related agencies
Government policy and actions involving the status of women in society
Abuse of older women
Violence against Aboriginal women

Membership

Subcommittees
Subcommittee on Agenda and Procedure (SFEW)

External links
 Standing Committee on the Status of Women (FEWO)

Status of Women